Douglas Matthew Davis, Jr. (April 11, 1933 – January 16, 2014) was an American artist, critic, teacher, and writer for among other publications Newsweek.

Artistic career
In 1977, at the opening of documenta 6, alongside Nam June Paik and Joseph Beuys, Douglas Davis took part in one of the first international satellite telecasts with his live performance The Last Nine Minutes. Davis received grants for his work by the Rockefeller Foundation, the National Endowment for the Arts & the Trust for Mutual Understanding, among other institutions.

Early internet works
His exploration of interactivity involving various media continued throughout the 1980s and 1990s. He is the author of one of the earliest art pieces on the World Wide Web, The World's First Collaborative Sentence (1994). His early work is featured on his website, The World's First Collaborative Sentence (1994), with elements from his exhibition InterActions 1967-1981. They include critical essays by Susan Hoeltzel, Michael Govan, David Ross, and Nam June Paik. Commissioned by the Lehman College Art Gallery, the Sentence was given by its collectors, Barbara and Eugene M. Schwartz, to the Whitney Museum of American Art. In 1997, P.S.1/The Institute of Contemporary Art joined with several other museums to host MetaBody (The World's First Collaborative Visions of the Beautiful), commissioned by George Waterman III. In 1997, Davis launched Terrible Beauty, an evolving global multi-media theater piece. Its "chapters" have been performed before audiences in New York, Dublin, San Francisco, and Berlin.

Teaching and writing

Davis taught advanced media at more than 25 universities and art colleges and served as consultant in this field for several corporations & foundations. Davis published the book Art and the Future in several countries in 1973. ArtCulture: Essays on the Post-Modern (1977), is a book of theoretical essays. The Five Myths of TV Power (or, Why the Medium is Not the Message), 1993, focuses on the crucial importance of the viewer, the "human" element in media theory.

Personal life
Davis lived and worked in New York City until his death on January 16, 2014. He was survived by three daughters, and two granddaughters. His wife of over 30 years, Jane Bell Davis, died in 2005.

Exhibitions
 The Anagrammatic Body, Neue Galerie, Graz, Austria, 1999
 The Net. Condition, Center for Art and Media, Karlsruhe, Germany, 1999
 The American Century, Part II, Whitney Museum, 1999
 Governor's Conference on the Arts and Technology, Information Technology Center, New York (installation), 1998
 P.S. 1/Institute of Contemporary Art, New York (website), 1997
 WithDrawing, Ronald Feldman Fine Arts, New York, 1996
 X-Art Foundation, New York, 1996
 Kwangju Biennale, Korea, 1995
 Museum Sztuki, Lodz, Poland, 1995 (retrospective)
 InterActions (1967–1981), Art Gallery, Lehman College, New York City, 1994
 Discours Amoureux, Galerie St. Gervais, Geneva, 1994
 TranceSex, Amanda Obering Gallery, Los Angeles, 1993
 Ronald Feldman Fine Arts (one-man), 1992, 1985, 1984, 1981, 1980, 1977
 Centro de Arte y Communicacion—Harrod's en Arte, Buenos Aires, 1991
 Kunstverein, Cologne, Germany, 1989
 Solomon R. Guggenheim Museum, 1986, 1988
 Whitney Museum of American Art, (Biennial 1985), 1981, 1977, 1972
 Venice Biennale, 1976, 1978, 1986
 The New Museum, New York City, 1983, 1984
 The Museum of Modern Art, 1983,
 The Hirshhorn Museum & Sculpture Garden, 1983, 1984
 Metropolitan Museum of Art, 1982 (traveling exhibition)
 Wadsworth Atheneum, 1982–1983
 Centre Pompidou, Paris, 1981

Publications
Essays on the Post-Modern. New York: Harper & Row, 1977. 
The Museum Transformed: Design and Culture in the Post-Pompidou Age. New York: Abbeville Press Publishers, 1990. 
The Five Myths of Television Power, Or, Why the Medium is Not the Message. Riverside, New Jersey, U.S.A.: Simon & Schuster, 1993.

References

Further reading
 
 Selz, Peter and Kristine Stiles. Theories and Documents of Contemporary Art. Berkeley, CA: University of California Press, 1997.
 Stanislawski, Ryszard, ed. Douglas Davis: Video Objekty Grafika. Lodz, Poland: Museum Sztuki, 1982.
 Kuspit, Donald. Douglas Davis. New York, NY: Solomon R. Guggenheim Museum, 1988.
 Walther, Ingo, ed. Art of the 20th Century. Cologne, Germany: Taschen, 1998.
 Weibel, Peter and Christa Steinle, eds. Anagrammatic Body. Graz, Austria: Neue Galerie, 2000.

External links
 Douglas Davis biography at Electronic Arts Intermix
 Douglas Davis biography at Media Art Net
 Douglas Davis timeline of projects at 1904.CC
 Interview with Douglas Davis
  
 {http://blogs.getty.edu/iris/vitaly-komar-exploring-the-lines-between-us/}
 Douglas Davis, Critic and Internet Artist, Dies at 80 - The New York Times

1933 births
2014 deaths
American video artists